Giada Rossi (born 24 August 1994 in San Vito al Tagliamento) is an Italian paralympic table tennis player. She competed at the 2016 Summer Paralympics, in Women's Singles Class 1-2, winning a bronze medal. She competed at the 2020 Summer Paralympics, in Women's team – Class 1–3, winning a bronze medal.

Achievements

See also
Italy at the 2016 Summer Paralympics
Italy at the 2020 Summer Paralympics

References

External links
 
 Athlete profile at Ability Channel web site

1994 births
Living people
Paralympic bronze medalists for Italy
Medalists at the 2016 Summer Paralympics
Medalists at the 2020 Summer Paralympics
Paralympic medalists in table tennis
Paralympic table tennis players of Italy
Table tennis players at the 2016 Summer Paralympics
Table tennis players at the 2020 Summer Paralympics
People from San Vito al Tagliamento
Sportspeople from Friuli-Venezia Giulia
Italian female table tennis players
21st-century Italian women